Parliamentary elections were held in North Korea on 27 August 1957 to elect members of the  2nd Supreme People's Assembly . Voters were presented with a single list from the Democratic Front for the Reunification of the Fatherland, dominated by the Workers' Party of Korea.

Only one candidate was presented in each constituency, all of which were selected by the WPK, although some ran under the banner of other parties or state organisations to give the illusion of democracy. Voter turnout was reported to be 99.99%, with 99.92% reportedly voting in favour of the candidates presented.

Its first session took place on 18–20 September 1957. One of its declarations was "On the Immediate Tasks of the People's Power in Socialist Construction".

Results

Composition of deputies
The following were elected as members of parliament:

Pyongyang city

South Pyongan

North Pyongan

Chagang

South Hwanghae

North Hwanghae

Kangwon

South Hamgyong

North Hamgyong

Ryanggang

Kaesong city

References

Parliamentary
North K
Elections in North Korea
Supreme People's Assembly
Election and referendum articles with incomplete results